Zahoor Hussain Qureshi   is a Pakistani politician who had been a member of the National Assembly of Pakistan from August 2018 till January 2023 from the NA-152 constituency of Tehsil Mian Channu & Khanewal district. He was also made Parliamentary Secretary for Ministry of Power.

Political career
He was elected to the National Assembly of Pakistan from Constituency NA-152 (Khanewal-III) as a candidate of Pakistan Tehreek-e-Insaf in 2018 Pakistani general election.

On 27 September 2018, Prime Minister Imran Khan appointed him as Federal Parliamentary Secretary for power.

References

External Link

More Reading
 List of members of the 15th National Assembly of Pakistan

Living people
Pakistani MNAs 2018–2023
Zahoor Hussain
Pakistan Tehreek-e-Insaf MNAs
1973 births